Khatib Gurab (also Romanized as Khaţīb Gūrāb) is a village in Rud Pish Rural District, in the Central District of Fuman County, Gilan Province, Iran. At the 2006 census, its population was 109, in 28 families.

References 

Populated places in Fuman County